Pleasant Township is one of thirteen townships in Grant County, Indiana, United States. As of the 2010 census, its population was 6,797 and it contained 3,166 housing units.

History
The Meshingomesia Cemetery and Indian School Historic District was listed on the National Register of Historic Places in 2013.

Geography
The stream of Jocinah Creek runs through this township.

Cities and towns
 Marion (northwest edge)
 Sweetser (northeast three-quarters)

Unincorporated towns
 Fox
 Jalapa
(This list is based on USGS data and may include former settlements.)

Adjacent townships
 Liberty Township, Wabash County (north)
 Washington Township (east)
 Center Township (southeast)
 Franklin Township (south)
 Sims Township (southwest)
 Richland Township (west)
 Waltz Township, Wabash County (northwest)

Cemeteries
The township contains two cemeteries: Maple Grove and Meshingomesia.

Major highways

References
 U.S. Board on Geographic Names (GNIS)
 United States Census Bureau cartographic boundary files

External links

 Indiana Township Association
 United Township Association of Indiana

Townships in Grant County, Indiana
Townships in Indiana